U.S. Route 59 (US-59) is a part of the U.S. Highway System that runs from the Mexico–US border in Laredo, Texas, as a continuation of Mexican Federal Highway 85D north to the Lancaster–Tolstoi Border Crossing on the Canada–US border, where it continues as Manitoba Highway 59. In the U.S. state of Kansas, US-59 is a main north–south highway that travels from Chetopa to Atchison.

Route description

US-59 is a  highway which runs from south to north in eastern Kansas.  It enters the state from Oklahoma south of Chetopa and passes through Parsons, Ottawa, Oswego, Moran, Garnette, and Lawrence.  The route leaves Kansas for Missouri by crossing the Missouri River at Atchison.  Most of the route climbs the cuestas of the Osage prairie, while north of the Kansas River, it cuts through the glaciated region.

Almost the entire length of US-59 in Kansas is maintained by the Kansas Department of Transportation (KDOT). The  section within Parsons is maintained by the city. The section within Lawrence is maintained by the city. The  section of US-59 within Atchison is maintained by the city. KDOT surveys the roads under its control on a regular basis to measure the amount of traffic using the state's highways. These traffic counts are expressed in terms of annual average daily traffic (AADT), a calculation of the average daily number of vehicles on a segment of roadway. For the 2012 survey, the stretch of road with the highest AADT was 8,249 vehicles per day south of the Lawrence city limits. The lowest was 380 vehicles per day at the Neosho–Allen county line. The statistic was not measured within large cities.

Southeastern Kansas
US-59 enters Kansas south of Chetopa along a two-lane highway. As it enters the town, it becomes known as 3rd Street. It intersects US-166, which runs along Maple Street. After curving to the north and reaching the northern city limits, US 166 splits off to the west and US-59 continues north.   to the north, it enters Oswego along Commerce Street where it crosses a line of the South Kansas & Oklahoma Railroad (SKOL). Near the Labette County courthouse, it meets 6th Street, which carries US-160. These two routes head west together and then to the northwest parallel to a single Union Pacific Railroad (UP) track. Northwest of Oswego, the two routes follow a curve to north and then to the west, which allows a safe crossing of the UP line. Just before reaching Altamont, US-59 splits off to the north leaving US-160 to continue west.

Eastern Kansas
After its intersection with US-54, US-59 continues north toward Mildred. In and around Mildred, the highway curves to once again parallel the UP railroad. The route enters Anderson County just north of Mildred and curves to the north. North of here, the route turns west and begins a concurrency with K-31. The highways continue west then bend to the north to bypass the city of Lone Elm. After trekking north, the routes warp to the west and intersect US-169. The three routes run concurrent until just south of Garnett, where US-169 splits off to the northeast at a roundabout. US-169 has a business route that begins at this roundabout and follows US-59 and K-31 north until 6th Street. Here, Bus. US-169 splits off to the east, while US-59 and K-31 continue north. The concurrency with K-31 ends in northern Garnett, as K-31 forks to the west at Park Street and US-59 continues north and leaves the city.

North of Garnett, US-59 bypasses a few small lakes by curving slightly to the west, then continues north and enters Franklin County. Immediately north of the county line is the small community of Richmond, which US-59 runs through the western portion of. A few miles north of here, a couple of curves take the highway northwest, and it heads north to the city of Princeton. The route continues north, through Princeton, and enters Ottawa near an interchange with Interstate 35 (I-35) and US-50. At this interchange, US-59 becomes concurrent with the two routes and becomes a freeway. The highways run east momentarily, then curve to the north and intersect K-68 and a business route of US-50. North of this interchange, the routes curve to the east, and US-59 leaves I-35 and US-50 at a trumpet interchange.

Northeastern Kansas

Ottawa to Lawrence
After leaving I-35/US-50, US-59 heads north as a controlled-access freeway. Previously, US-59 had run through Ottawa to Lawrence as a two-lane road. Due to high accident rates, this stretch of US-59 was converted into a divided highway, with the project reaching completion in 2012. The old road was turned over to Franklin and Douglas counties, with the Douglas County portion being re-designated as Douglas County highway 1045.

The US-59 freeway passes through rural Franklin County and crosses into Douglas County. Three miles north of the county line, it has an interchange with US-56, roughly four miles west of Baldwin City. It bypasses the unincorporated community of Pleasant Grove (the former alignment passed through the settlement). South of Lawrence, Douglas County highway 458 becomes concurrent with US-59 for a two-mile stretch. Following this interchange, the freeway downgrades to an expressway with at-grade intersections, and the speed limit drops from 70 to 55 mph. After CR-458 leaves US-59 at an at-grade intersection, US-59 reaches the south side of Lawrence and crosses K-10, known as the South Lawrence Trafficway, which heads west as a Super-2 toward Clinton Lake, the Kansas Turnpike, and Lecompton; and east as a divided freeway toward Olathe and Lenexa. Prior to November 2016, K-10 was merged with US-59 between the South Lawrence Trafficway and 23rd Street due to lawsuits over the completion of the road.

In Lawrence, US-59 runs along Iowa Street, home to many retail shopping centers and fast-food restaurants. North of 23rd Street/Clinton Parkway, US-59 runs along the western edge of the University of Kansas. After crossing 9th Street, travelers seeking access to the Kansas Turnpike can exit US-59 onto MacDonald Drive, while US-59 becomes concurrent with US-40 at 6th Street.

US-40/US-59 runs east along 6th Street until approaching Downtown Lawrence. At this point, the highway turns north and crosses the Kansas River into the district of North Lawrence, where the road forms parts of North 2nd Street and North 3rd Street. US-40/US-59 has an interchange with the Kansas Turnpike, signed as Interstate 70, at the Turnpike's East Lawrence plaza. After this, US-40/US-59 exits the Lawrence city limits.

Lawrence to Atchison
After leaving Lawrence, US-40/US-59 meets US-24 at an intersection known locally as "Teepee Junction". US-40 joins with US-24 EB en route to Tonganoxie, while US-59 joins with US-24 WB en route to Oskaloosa and Topeka. US-24/US-59 runs northwest parallel to the Union Pacific Railroad as it crosses the Douglas/Jefferson county line. Then the road turns sharply north and then due west, passing a local cemetery, before approaching the unincorporated community of Williamstown. At this point, the two highways split off, with US-24 continuing west toward Perry and Topeka, while US-59 heads north toward Oskaloosa. Previously, this intersection also included K-76, a very short route which ran into Williamstown itself. K-76 was decommissioned in 2013, and all signage and reference to it has been removed.

From Williamstown, US-59 continues north as a two lane highway. This stretch of US-59 is part of "The Iron Men Of Metz Highway", a designation running from Topeka to Leavenworth and including the segment of US-59 between Williamstown and its junction with K-16/K-92 just outside of Oskaloosa. At this junction, K-16 and K-92 both become concurrent with US-59. The road enters Oskaloosa, and K-92 leaves the concurrency to head west toward Perry Lake. US-59/K-16 continues north until it meets a junction with K-192 west of Winchester, at which point K-16 leaves the road and heads west toward Valley Falls. From here US-59 continues north until reaching Nortonville. It forms the eastern terminus of K-4, then almost immediately has a junction with child route US-159, which heads north to Effingham. After this, US-59 crosses into Atchison County and takes a more northeasterly route as it crosses the county. Much of this stretch runs parallel to the BNSF Railroad. US-59 enters Atchison and becomes part of a wrong-way concurrency with US-73 as it runs through the western portion of town. This concurrency ends at a junction with K-7, as US-73 leaves US-59 to become concurrent with K-7 and run south to Leavenworth. US-59 continues east on its own through the rest of town and crosses the Amelia Earhart Memorial Bridge into Winthrop, Missouri, en route to St. Joseph.

Major intersections

References

External links

Kansas Department of Transportation State Map
KDOT: Historic State Maps

 Kansas
59
Transportation in Labette County, Kansas
Transportation in Neosho County, Kansas
Transportation in Allen County, Kansas
Transportation in Anderson County, Kansas
Transportation in Franklin County, Kansas
Transportation in Douglas County, Kansas
Transportation in Jefferson County, Kansas
Transportation in Atchison County, Kansas